Sir Frederick Bowker Terrington Carter,   (February 12, 1819 – March 1, 1900) was a lawyer and Premier of Newfoundland from 1865 to 1870 and from 1874 to 1878.

Career
Carter was the son of Peter Weston Carter grandson of William Carter and great-grandson of Robert Carter, who was appointed justice of the peace at Ferryland in 1750. In 1855, he was elected to the House of Assembly as a Conservative and was Speaker from 1861 to 1865. In 1865 he succeeded Sir Hugh Hoyles as Prime Minister.

Carter was a supporter of Canadian confederation having been a delegate to the 1864 Quebec conference. However, the Conservatives were defeated on the Confederation issue in the November 1869 election by the Anti-Confederation Party led by Charles Fox Bennett. Even though Newfoundland did not join the confederation until 1949, Carter is considered one of the Fathers of Confederation. Carter became Premier a second time in 1874, serving until 1878, but had dropped the issue of joining Canada. He was appointed a Knight Commander of the Order of St Michael and St George (KCMG) in 1878.

In 1880 Carter was appointed Chief Justice of the Supreme Court of Newfoundland, succeeding Sir Hugh Hoyles, and served in the post until 1898. During his term as Chief Justice, Carter was a valued advisor for the Colonial Governors of Newfoundland and acted as administrator of the colony in their absence.

Carter was a Freemason of St. John's Lodge, No. 579, a Newfoundland lodge under the United Grand Lodge of England.

He died in St. John's, Newfoundland in early March 1900.

Family
Carter married, in 1846, Eliza Bayly, daughter of George Bayly, Controller of HM Customs, Newfoundland. The couple had eleven children.

References

External links
 
Sir Frederic Bowker Terrington Carter

1819 births
1900 deaths
Canadian Anglicans
Fathers of Confederation
Knights Commander of the Order of St Michael and St George
Premiers of Newfoundland Colony
People from St. John's, Newfoundland and Labrador
Persons of National Historic Significance (Canada)
Newfoundland Colony judges
Speakers of the Newfoundland and Labrador House of Assembly
Canadian Freemasons